Fusicladium is a genus of fungus in the family Venturiaceae. Specimens of Fusicladium may be found across the world. Many species are plant pathogens, infecting at least 52 plant genera including apple trees, pea plants, and peach trees. These infectious species are each often host-specific, meaning they can only survive on specific species of plant. 

The precise taxonomy of the genus is still under investigation. DNA analysis has shown that species from the genera Pollaccia and Spilocaea belong in a single clade with Fusicladium. Fusicladium is sometimes written Fusicladium s.l. (meaning "Fusicladium in the wider sense") to reflect this.

Species 
Species in the genus Fusicladium include:

References 

Venturiaceae